HK FCC Město Lovosice is a handball club from Lovosice, Czech Republic, that plays in the Chance Extraliga.

History

The club was founded in 1956, then as a women's handball division. Later, women's handball was relegated to the background, and in 1969 it was completely discontinued. Almost at the same time as the women, but a year later, a male student category was added, and then gradually the men as well. Club advanced in 1977 to the first Czechoslovak league. In 1982 was built Sportovní hala Chemik. Club played in EHF Challenge Cup in 2008/2009 and EHF Cup in 2012/2013.

Crest, colours, supporters

Club crest

Kit manufacturers

Kits

Management

Team

Current squad 

Squad for the 2022–23 season

Technical staff
 Head Coach:  Roman Jelínek
 Assistant Coach:  Martin Hríb
 Physiotherapist:  Petra Čermáková

Transfers

Transfers for the 2022–23 season

Joining 
  Pavel Horák (LB) from  THW Kiel
  Marek Hniďák (RB) from  HC Burgenland

Leaving 
  Jan Hrdlička (GK) to  MKS Kalisz
  Jiří Bouček (CB)
  David Kylišek (CB)

Previous squads

Accomplishments 

 Czech Handball Extraliga:
 : 2011, 2015
 : 2006, 2007, 2014

Former club members

Notable former players

  František Arnošt (1975–1978)
  Milan Berka (1995–1998, 2010–2013)
  Bedřich Ciner (1970–1972)
  Pavel Horák (2022–)
  Jan Landa (2015–2018)
  Jiří Motl (2002–)
  Jakub Vaněk (2015–2020)

Former coaches

References

External links
 
 

Czech handball clubs
Handball clubs established in 1956